Ambodiadabo may rever to multiple places in Madagascar:
 Ambodiadabo, a commune in Bealanana District, Sofia Region
 Ambodiadabo, a commune in Mandritsara District, Sofia Region